"Cluck Old Hen" is a popular Appalachian fiddle and banjo tune in the mixolydian or dorian mode (as in the score below which is in A dorian).  It is played either as an instrumental or with lyrics, which vary from one version to another. One of the earliest reported transcriptions of the tune dates from 1886. The earliest recording is attributed to Fiddlin' John Carson, in 1923.

Score

See also
Old time music
Rising Appalachia

References

External links

History 
 Description in "Traditional Ballad Index of Folk Songs from the English-Speaking World", Folklore department, California State University, Fresno
 Discussion thread regarding lyrics and origins, from Mudcat Café

Recordings and transcriptions 
 The sheet music
 Recording by Fiddlin' and Family Powers information and mp3 download from Project Gutenberg*.

American folk songs
Songwriter unknown
1886 songs
1927 singles